An evil empire is a speculative fiction trope.

Evil Empire may also refer to:

 Evil Empire speech, given by U.S. President Ronald Reagan referring to the Soviet Union in 1983

Arts and entertainment
 Evil Empire (album), by Rage Against the Machine, 1996
 Evil Empire: A Talk by Chalmers Johnson, a 2007 American documentary film
 The Evil Empire: 101 Ways That England Ruined the World, a 2007 book by Steven Grasse
 "Evil Empire", a 1989 song by Joe Jackson from Blaze of Glory
 Evil Empire, a French video game development studio spun off from Motion Twin

Sports teams with the nickname
 Edmonton Eskimos, Canadian Football League
 New England Patriots, National Football League
 New York Yankees, Major League Baseball

See also
Evil Emperor (disambiguation)